South Dakota Highway 127 (SD 127) is a highway that runs from North Dakota Highway 127, northwest of White Rock to South Dakota Highway 10 in Sisseton. It was commissioned around 1980.

History
The route that is currently South Dakota 127 was established in 1926 as part of U.S. Highway 81, the Meridian Highway.  In 1980, construction of the segment of Interstate 29 was completed north of exit 246, and U.S. 81 was rerouted from this point northward into North Dakota.  The old route from I-29 to the North Dakota border near White Rock was designated as South Dakota Highway 127.

In 1984, when construction of I-29 between Peever and New Effington was completed, this segment of U.S. 81 was also routed onto it, and South Dakota 127 was extended along its former alignment, to South Dakota Highway 10 east of Sisseton.

Major intersections

References 

127
Transportation in Roberts County, South Dakota